The Paper Store is a 2016 drama film directed by Nicholas Gray, and written by Gray and  Katharine Clark Gray, adapted from the latter's play 516. The film is produced by Jonathan Gray, John Grossman (NYPS), and casting director Bonnie Timmermann and stars Stef Dawson, Penn Badgley, and Richard Kind.

Synopsis
A revenge tale about a former college student who forges essays for money, the grad student who becomes her lover, and the professor who discovers their scheme.

Cast 
 Stef Dawson as Annalee Monegan
 Penn Badgley as Sigurd Rossdale
 Richard Kind as Professor Marty Kane
 Clifton Dunn as Hooper
 Caitlin Mehner as Emily
  Kenton Cummings as Reynaldo
 Patrick Hogue as Bishop

Production 
The Paper Store is a film adaptation of Katharine Clark Gray's play 516 (five-sixteen), workshopped at the New York International Fringe Festival in 2007, with four out of five stars on Time Out (magazine). 516 received its first professional debut through Philadelphia Theater Workshop in 2010, culminating in plans to adapt the play into a film shortly thereafter.

Katharine and her husband, Nicholas Gray, were producing partners at A Chip & A Chair Films (If You Could Say It In Words) for eight years before branching off to create Uncompromised Creative. The company partnered with producers Jonathan Gray, Bonnie Timmermann, John Grossman, executive producer Bruce Meyerson, and co-executive producers Actium Pictures and Matthew Bronson, to make The Paper Store, Uncompromised Creative's feature debut.

Filming took place in New York City and Syracuse, NY. The interiors of all three leads' homes were shot on the re-decorated apartment sets from Broad City (2014).

Release 
Video on-demand-rights were licensed by Flix Premiere. The film was released on June 9, 2017 in the United States and June 17 in the United Kingdom. On July 24, 2018 the movie became widely available via Amazon and iTunes on V.O.D., with DVD release to follow on October 9, 2018.

Reception 
 Named Best Drama of 2016 by the LA Film Review. The review called the script "expertly adapted" from its source material, and declared that the film "gives us a world that is far from black and white — one where it’s really easy to claim high standards, while simultaneously betraying them with the most plausible of explanations."
 The Manchester Evening News named The Paper Store as one of the "six best films you have to see" of the Manchester Film Festival, and FranklyMyDear UK described it as "the ultimate tale of romance and revenge set in academia."
 The Film Stage said that "few narrative films have touched on [the rising cost of higher education] so pointedly or deftly as The Paper Store".

Accolades 
2016
 Manchester International Film Festival, with a Jury Special Mention for Lead Actor (Penn Badgley).
 Hollywood Reel Independent Film Festival 
 Manhattan Film Festival - named Best Dramatic Feature 
 Oxford International Film Festival official  awarded Best Actress to Stef Dawson and Best Actor to Penn Badgley
 New Filmmakers NY
 Fort Worth Indie Film Showcase - won Best Foreign Drama, "foreign" referring to productions outside Texas
 Pittsburgh Independent Film Festival

References

External links 
 
 https://flixpremiere.com/film/the-paper-store
 Manchester International Film Festival - 2016

2016 films
American films based on plays
Films shot in New York City
2010s English-language films